"Addicted" is a song by R&B singer Danny Fernandes. It's the fifth track and single off his debut album Intro.

Chart performance
It was released on October 2009 and entered the Canadian Hot 100 on the week of November 14, 2009 peaking at number 49 on the chart. It stayed a total of 12 weeks in the charts until January 30, 2010.

References

2008 songs
2009 singles
CP Music Group singles
Danny Fernandes songs
Songs written by Belly (rapper)